Marlington High School is a public high school in Lexington Township, Ohio near Alliance.  It is the only high school in the Marlington Local School District.  The name is a portmanteau of Marlboro and Lexington or Washington townships, and the district actually covers those mostly rural areas and northern, western, and southern parts of Alliance itself (the middle and high schools are located just outside the city limits, and there is an elementary school in each of the three townships). Marlington's sports teams are nicknamed the Dukes. The sports  affiliation is the Eastern Buckeye Conference.

Notable alumni
 Luke Witte, Cleveland Cavalier, church minister
 Paul Stuffel, Former MLB player (Philadelphia Phillies)
Dymonte Thomas, NFL Safety (Denver Broncos) and business-owner

Ohio High School Athletic Association State Championships

Team
 Girls Softball – 1996 
 Boys Cross Country 2021

Individual
 Jarrod Eick - Division II Track and Field 1600 Meters - 2009
 Jarrod Eick Division - Division II Cross Country - 2008

Other OHSAA Awards

Individual
 2010 Men's Cross Country Team - Division II State Championships- 8th Place
Ryan Headley - State Qualifier Golf - 2011
 Brian Baum - Division I State Boys Track and Field 800 Meters - 5th Place
 Boys OHSAA Cross Country champions 2021
 Boys OHSAA Cross Country champions 2022

External links
 District Website

Notes and references

High schools in Stark County, Ohio
Public high schools in Ohio